Chakdwipa High School is a higher secondary school affiliated to the West Bengal Board of Secondary Education and West Bengal Council of Higher Secondary Education in the state of West Bengal, India. The school is named after  Chakdwipa, a village by the river Haldi.

History
Established in 1949, the approximate student strength of this school is 2000. The teaching faculty strength is around 30 (with a number of para-teachers, part-time teachers recruited as a part of Sarba Shiksha Abhiyan.

The school boasts of 'Prafulla Smriti Vignan Sanstha' which has a collection of biological samples, some rare.

Some of the major developments in this school were due to the late Paresh Chandra Malakar, the ex-headmaster of the school. Dr. Subesh Kuity had a brief period as headmaster. The present HM is Ashis Patra, an ex-student of the school.

Alumni Association:

Chakdwipa Praktani, formed in February 2011 (www.ChakdwipaPraktani.info) is the official Alumni Association of Chakdwipa High School.

See also
Education in India
List of schools in India
Education in West Bengal

References

External links 

High schools and secondary schools in West Bengal
Educational institutions established in 1949
1949 establishments in West Bengal